Sevkabel, based in St.Petersburg, Russia, is a cable manufacturing company.

History

Sevkabel was founded in 1879 by the St.Petersburg subsidiary of the German company Siemens & Halske. Following the Russian Revolution in 1917, the company was nationalized. By 1931 Sevkabel was making paper-insulated, lead-covered high voltage cables, the first to be produced in Russia. During the Siege of Leningrad in 1942, Sevkabel produced over 100 km of submarine medium-voltage cable which was laid on the bed of Lake Ladoga, restoring the energy supply of the besieged city from Volkhov Hydroelectric Station.  In 1993 Sevkabel was privatized. In 2017-19, the historical part of the Sevkabel plant on the shore of Vasilyevsky Island was redeveloped, being transformed into an art hub, Sevkabel Port.

Products
Sevkabel produces electrical cable products for the energy, construction, industrial, and specialty markets. The company's power cables include low-, medium- and high-voltage power distribution and power transmission products. Sevkabel's application-specific industrial and specialty cables are used in electrical power generation — traditional and renewable — the oil, gas and petrochemical industries; mining, marine, transit, military, infrastructure, residential, geophysical and OEM applications. Sevkabel sells its products under several brands including Kabtron®, Robustek®, Aquatron®, and Kabprotek®. Sevkabel owns a R&D bureau specializing in design of custom cables and cables accessories. In 2018 Sevkabel produced a special coaxial cable for the ITER facility in France.

References

External links 

 

Manufacturing companies of Russia
Companies based in Saint Petersburg
Companies established in 1879
Wire and cable manufacturers